Coras may refer to:

People
 Jean de Coras (1515–1572), French jurist
 Jacques de Coras (1630–1677), French poet
 Marcel Coraş (born 1959), Romanian footballer

Biology
 Coras (spider), a genus of spiders

Other
 The Cora people, a native people of Mexico; see also:
 Cora language
 Misión Santiago de Los Coras
 Coras F.C., a Mexican association football club based in Tepic, Nayarit, Mexico
 Coras F.C. B, the official reserve team of Coras F.C.
 Córas na Poblachta, a minor Irish political party founded in 1940
 Córas Iompair Éireann, a public transport authority in Ireland

Language and nationality disambiguation pages